Diplomatic presence of the United States of America in Papua New Guinea began on September 16, 1975 when the latter became an independent state. The United States Embassy was opened on September 10, 1975 and Mary S. Olmsted became the first U.S. Ambassador to Papua New Guinea on January 5, 1976. Since establishment of a diplomatic mission in Port Moresby, the United States Ambassador to Papua New Guinea has also been accredited to Solomon Islands and Vanuatu.

The United States Embassy in Papua New Guinea is located in Port Moresby.

Ambassadors
Mary S. Olmsted – Career FSO
Title: Envoy Extraordinary and Minister Plenipotentiary.
Appointed: January 5, 1976
Terminated mission: Left post, July 28, 1979
Harvey J. Feldman – Political Appointee
Title: Envoy Extraordinary and Minister Plenipotentiary.
Appointed: September 26, 1979
Terminated mission: Left post, May 25, 1981
M. Virginia Schafer – Career FSO
Title: Envoy Extraordinary and Minister Plenipotentiary.
Appointed: November 3, 1981
Terminated mission: Left post, May 20, 1984
Paul Fisher Gardner – Career FSO
Title: Envoy Extraordinary and Minister Plenipotentiary.
Appointed: September 7, 1984
Terminated mission: Left post, October 1, 1986
Everett E. Bierman – Political Appointee
Title: Envoy Extraordinary and Minister Plenipotentiary.
Appointed: November 11, 1986
Terminated mission: Left post, October 30, 1989
Robert William Farrand – Career FSO
Title: Envoy Extraordinary and Minister Plenipotentiary.
Appointed: May 1, 1990
Terminated mission: Left post, September 13, 1993
Richard W. Teare – Career FSO
Title: Envoy Extraordinary and Minister Plenipotentiary.
Appointed: November 23, 1993
Terminated mission: Left post, July 14, 1996
Arma Jane Karaer – Career FSO
Title: Envoy Extraordinary and Minister Plenipotentiary.
Appointed: April 15, 1997
Terminated mission: Left post, May 28, 2000
Susan S. Jacobs – Career FSO
Title: Envoy Extraordinary and Minister Plenipotentiary.
Appointed: November 7, 2000
Terminated mission: Left post, August 1, 2003
Robert W. Fitts – Career FSO
Title: Envoy Extraordinary and Minister Plenipotentiary.
Appointed: September 11, 2003
Terminated mission: Left post, September 5, 2006
Leslie V. Rowe – Career FSO
Title: Envoy Extraordinary and Minister Plenipotentiary.
Appointed: September 5, 2006
Terminated mission: Left post, September 21, 2009
Teddy B. Taylor – Career FSO
Title: Envoy Extraordinary and Minister Plenipotentiary.
Appointed: September 21, 2009
Terminated mission: November 7, 2012
Walter E. North - Career FSO
Title: Envoy Extraordinary and Minister Plenipotentiary.
Appointed: January 31, 2013
Terminated mission: January 22, 2016
Catherine Ebert-Gray - Career FSO
Title: Envoy Extraordinary and Minister Plenipotentiary.
Appointed: February 23, 2016
Terminated mission: November 17, 2019
Erin Elizabeth McKee - Career FSO
Title: Envoy Extraordinary and Minister Plenipotentiary.
Appointed: November 27, 2019
Terminated mission: April 14, 2022

Notes

See also
Papua New Guinea – United States relations
Foreign relations of Papua New Guinea
Ambassadors of the United States

References
United States Department of State: Background notes on Papua New Guinea

External links
 United States Department of State: Chiefs of Mission for Papua New Guinea
 United States Department of State: Papua New Guinea
 United States Embassy in Port Moresby

Papua New Guinea

United States